Blepephaeus multinotatus is a species of beetle in the family Cerambycidae found in Asia in countries such as Vietnam.

References

Blepephaeus